Pierre Hujoel (traditional Chinese: 胡月) is a Belgian composer, pianist and vocalist.

Biography 
Hujoel was born in Brussels, Belgium in 1979. He learned singing and music theory at an early age and followed Belgian pianist Evelyn Groynne's teaching during his teenage, who enabled him to perform his compositions in public. In 2001, he obtained a First Prize in classical piano at the Royal Conservatory of Brussels in Jean-Claude Vanden Eynden's class, a First Prize in harmony at the Royal Conservatory of Mons in Jean-Pierre Deleuze's class and, in 2007, a master's degree in musical composition at the Royal Conservatory of Mons in Claude Ledoux's class. He then moved to Taipei, Taiwan in order to learn Chinese at National Taiwan Normal University and compose music for the local contemporary art and television. Meanwhile, he started collaborating with Belgian-French film director Joachim Olender. In 2009, he engaged in an ongoing piano-, voice- and electronics-based project. Between 2009 and 2021, he toured the world with various acts, such as electronic music duo April Red 紅, world music artist 蘇珮卿 Paige Su and singer-songwriter卜星慧 Emily Pu, as well as his own: 胡月 Western Moon, Children in Love, Hujoel. He published three studio albums (two LP's and one EP) and was involved in the publication of two (one LP and one EP). In 2019, he joined Taiwan-based acapella group AWKwapella 尷尬美聲. He currently teaches master's course in harmony at the Royal Conservatory of Mons, focuses on his solo project and keeps making film music.

Discography 

紅 (2013) (HighNote Records)
 胡月 Western Moon (2014)
 Children in Love (2016) (Taiwan Ministry of Culture) (HighNote Records, StreetVoice)
 Her (2016) (Taiwan Colors Music)
 My World is Yours (2019) (StreetVoice)

Film Music 

 Sarabande, documentary from Belgian director Thomas Joiret (2005)
 紙道, exhibition from 台北樹火紀念紙文化基金會 Taipei Suho Paper Museum (2005)
 Languages d’épiderme, art film from Belgian artist Roger Remacle (2006) (Communauté française de Belgique)
 Paper + Ink, A Dialogue in Time, exhibition from 台北樹火紀念紙文化基金會 Taipei Suho Paper Museum (2007)
 巴黎 台北 單車萬歲, documentary from French-Taiwanese director Jean-Robert Thomann (2009) (Taiwan Public Television)
 Bloody Eyes, fiction from Belgian director Joachim Olender (2011) (Le Fresnoy - Studio national des arts contemporains)
 Lab 1030 Schaerbeek, documentary from Belgian director Ta Yang Hsu (2011) (Commune de Schaerbeek)
 Tarnac. Le chaos et la grâce, art film from Belgian director Joachim Olender (2012) (Le Fresnoy - Studio national des arts contemporains)
 盼望, art film from Taiwanese director 林淑雲 Alma Lin (2012) (National Taiwan University of Arts)
 As a Mirror, art film from Taiwanese director 林淑雲 Alma Lin (2012) (National Taiwan University of Arts)
 Utoya. Fragments d’une archive fictionnelle, live performance from Belgian director Joachim Olender (2015) (Centre Pompidou)
 No Biggie, animation film from Taiwanese director C.H. Fanchiang (2015) (Tainan National University of the Arts)
 Bliss/Cybermoutons, VR game from French artist Léa Rogliano (2017)
 Shift, art film from French director Léa Rogliano (2017)
 Le Musée de Berlin, art film from Belgian director Joachim Olender (2018) (Le Fresnoy - Studio national des arts contemporains)
 Ce que l'oeil ne voit pas, documentary from French director Léa Rogliano and Pierre Hujoel (2021)

References 

Living people
1979 births
Musicians from Brussels
Belgian composers
Royal Conservatory of Brussels alumni